Il demonio (English: The Demon) is a 1963 Italian horror film directed by Brunello Rondi. The film premiered at the 24th Venice International Film Festival.

Plot 
Purificata "Purif" is a lonely, uninhibited young peasant living in a small village of Lucania, where she is treated as a pariah by the locals. Purif has an unhealthy obsession with Antonio, an engaged man, and makes desperate, inappropriate attempts to court him. Though attracted to Purif, Antonio denies her. On one occasion, Purif tricks Antonio into drinking wine laced with her blood, and then claims he is cursed to die. Purif continues to stalk Antonio, and watches his wedding procession from a distance, but goes into a rage outside the cathedral.

While Antonio and his wife prepare to consummate the marriage, Puri attempts to place another curse outside the house using a dead cat, but is chased away by villagers who are monitoring at Antonio's behest. Puri flees outside of the town, and is met by a sheep herder who binds her arms and legs before raping her. The following morning, while bathing in a creek, Purif is greeted by Salvatore, an adolescent boy who has apparently recovered from a long illness. Shortly after having this encounter, Purif learns that Salvatore is on his deathbed, and that a priest has read him his last rites. 

Puri goes to Salvatore's home, where she finds the boy has just died, surrounded by family members. They accuse her of being a witch, and she is taken away by Father Tommaso. Puri, claiming she has spoken to Satan and is cursed due to her practice of witchcraft, is subsequently placed in the care of Zio Giuseppe, a local charlatan whom Puri's family believes can cleanse her soul; however, Giuseppe merely exploits the situation, using it as an opportunity to sexually violate Puri. After leaving Giuseppe's, Puri encounters Antonio plowing a field. She pleads with him, but he aggressively denies her, pushing her onto the ground and threatening her.

That night, Puri awakens in her bed with no control of her body, experiencing apparent demonic possession. The local parish attempts to identify the demon and exorcise Puri, to no success. The villagers begin to harass Puri, attempting to burn her alive. Puri's parents dig a hole on their property and create a makeshift bedroom for her, which they cover with wood planks and soil to keep her hidden from the locals. However, when Antonio arrives and calls out her name, Puri begins to respond, leading to the villagers discovering her hiding place. 

Puri flees, and begins walking aimlessly near a convent, where nuns witness her hugging a tree. The nuns decide to help her, but Puri attempts to strangle one of them when she recites the trinitarian formula. Meanwhile, Antonio begins to exhibit welts on his body, apparently from Puri's curse. He seeks help from Giuseppe, who instructs him to create a bonfire in the center of town using old-growth wood, which Giuseppe claims will rid the village of Puri. In the midst of the bonfire, in which the other villagers are participating, Antonio is met by Puri, who leads him away. The two fall to the ground and engage in sex. At dawn, Antonio awakens and stabs Puri to death.

Cast 
 Daliah Lavi as Purificata "Puri"
 Frank Wolff as Antonio 
 Dario Dolci as Father Don Tommaso
 Nicola Tagliacozzo as Zio Giuseppe 
 Anna María Aveta as Sister Angela 
 Rossana Rovere as Antonio's Wife

Production 
The film was shot in Matera, Montescaglioso and Miglionico in the Italian region of Basilicata.

Themes
Film scholars Keith McDonald and Wayne Johnson cite Il demonio as an early progenitor of the folk horror genre due to its themes of superstition and curses, occurring in a pastoral setting.

References

Sources

External links

1963 films
Italian drama films
Italian horror films
Demons in film
Films about Catholicism
Films about curses
Films about exorcism
Films about witchcraft
Films directed by Brunello Rondi
Films shot in Matera
Folk horror films
Films about mental health
Religious horror films
1960s Italian films